Shearwater is an album by Martin Carthy, released in 1972 on the Pegasus label as PEG12. It was re-released on vinyl in 1973/74 by Mooncrest as CREST25. The album was re-issued on CD in 1995, by Mooncrest, as CRESTCD 008 and then again, in March 2005 by Castle Music, as CMQCD1096.

Track listing
All songs Traditional; arranged by Martin Carthy
 "I Was a Young Man" (Roud 1572) – 2:46
 "Banks of Green Willow" (Roud 172; Child 24) – 4:31
 "Handsome Polly-O" (Roud 545) – 2:31
 "Outlandish Knight" (Roud 21; Child 4) – 5:25
 "He Called for a Candle" (Roud 269, Laws K43)– 2:49
 "John Blunt" (Roud 115; Child 275) – 3:25
 "Lord Randall" (Roud 10; Child 12) – 4:34
 "William Taylor" (Roud 158; Laws N11) – 3:42
 "Famous Flower of Serving Men" (Roud 199; Child 106) – 9:23
 "Betsy Bell and Mary Gray" (Roud 237; Child 201) – 1:33

Additional tracks on the 2005 Castle CD
The Castle CD reissue has three bonus tracks from the BBC Radio 1 John Peel session recorded on 22 May 1972 at the Playhouse Theatre, Northumberland Avenue, London, broadcast on 30 May 1972:
 "The False Lover Won Back" (Roud 201; Child 218) - 4.12
 "King Henry" (Roud 3867; Child 32) - 5.42
 "Trimdon Grange" (Roud 3189) - 4.06

Personnel
 Martin Carthy – vocals, guitar, dulcimer
 Maddy Prior – vocals on "Betsy Bell and Mary Gray"
 uncredited – drone on "William Taylor"
Technical
 Terry Brown - producer (for September Productions Ltd)
 Jerry Boys - engineer
David Berney Wade - art direction, design

References

Martin Carthy albums
1972 albums
Albums produced by Terry Brown (record producer)